Eutetras is a genus of Mexican flowering plants in the daisy family.

 Species
 Eutetras palmeri A.Gray- Zacatecas, Aguascalientes
 Eutetras pringlei Greenm. - Guanajuato, Hidalgo

References

Asteraceae genera
Endemic flora of Mexico
Perityleae